Frankie and Johnny in the Clair de Lune is a two-character play by Terrence McNally that was first performed off-Broadway in 1987.

Plot
The play focuses on two lonely, middle-aged people whose first date ends with their tumbling into bed. The two are in her one-room walk-up apartment in the west side of Manhattan. Johnny (originated by F. Murray Abraham), a short order cook, is in good physical condition; but Frankie (originated by Kathy Bates), a waitress, is frumpy, fat, and emotionally defined by her unattractiveness. Johnny is certain he has found his soul mate in Frankie. She, on the other hand, is far more cautious and disinclined to jump to conclusions and at first has written off the encounter as a one night stand. As the night unfolds, they slowly begin to reveal themselves to each other as they take tentative steps towards the possible start of a new relationship. Describing the scene from which the play gets its name, David Finkle wrote, "Johnny calls the radio station to request the most beautiful music ever written... Claude Debussy's "Clair de lune"... floats onto the night air... Johnny, buoyant with love, beckons Frankie to join him at the window and to bask... in the clair de lune. It's a lovely moment..."

Productions

Off-Broadway
The play opened Off-Broadway on June 2, 1987 at Stage II of the Manhattan Theatre Club, where it ran for two weeks. Directed by Paul Benedict, the original cast starred Kathy Bates and F. Murray Abraham. On October 14, 1987 it opened at Stage I for a six-week run. Kenneth Welsh played the part of Johnny in the Stage I production. On December 4, 1987 the play transferred to the Westside Theatre, and closed on March 12, 1989. Kathy Bates won a 1988 Obie Award and was nominated for a 1987-1988 Drama Desk Award.

Broadway
The play opened on Broadway on July 26, 2002 in previews, officially on August 8, 2002 at the Belasco Theatre.  Directed by Joe Mantello, the production starred Edie Falco and Stanley Tucci. The play closed on March 9, 2003 after 243 performances and 15 previews. Rosie Perez and Joe Pantoliano were replacements as of January 2003.

The play received Tony Award nominations for 2003 for Best Revival of a Play and for Tucci for Best Performance by a Leading Actor in a Play.

A revival opened on Broadway beginning May 4, 2019 in previews, officially on May 30, 2019 at the Broadhurst Theatre in a limited run. Audra McDonald and Michael Shannon star in a production directed by Arin Arbus. The play closed on July 28, 2019.

Adaptations
A 1991 film adaptation by McNally shortened the title to Frankie and Johnny. It starred Al Pacino and Michelle Pfeiffer. He made several changes from the play, adding new characters and locations.

Frankie and Johnny Are Married (2003) is a comedy film that refers to McNally's play. Written and directed by Michael Pressman, it explores the troubles a producer (which Pressman played as himself) has trying to mount a production of the Terrence McNally play.

References

External links
Original Off-Broadway production, Internet Off-Broadway Database
2002 Broadway production at Internet Broadway Database
2019 Broadway production at Internet Broadway Database
New York Times review, subscription required

1987 plays
American plays adapted into films
Broadway plays
Plays by Terrence McNally
Plays set in New York City
Two-handers